Sakti Kumar Sarkar  is an Indian politician belonging to the Janata Party and was elected from Jaynagar, West Bengal to the Lok Sabha, lower house of the Parliament of India.

References

External links
Official biographical sketch in Parliament of India website

1930 births
People from West Bengal
India MPs 1971–1977
India MPs 1977–1979
Living people
Lok Sabha members from West Bengal
People from Jaynagar Majilpur